This article summarizes the phonology (the sound system, or in more general terms, the pronunciation) of Standard Chinese (Standard Mandarin).

Standard Chinese phonology is based on the Beijing dialect of Mandarin. Actual production varies widely among speakers, as they introduce elements of their native varieties (although television and radio announcers are chosen for their ability to produce the standard variety). Elements of the sound system include not only the segments – the vowels and consonants – of the language but also the tones that are applied to each syllable. Standard Chinese has four main tones, in addition to a neutral tone used on weak syllables.

This article represents phonetic values using the International Phonetic Alphabet (IPA), noting correspondences chiefly with the Pinyin system for transcription of Chinese text. For correspondences with other systems, see the relevant articles, such as Wade–Giles, Bopomofo (Zhuyin), Gwoyeu Romatzyh, etc., and Romanization of Chinese.

Consonants
The following table shows the consonant sounds of Standard Chinese, transcribed using the International Phonetic Alphabet.

Between pairs of stops or affricates having the same place of articulation and manner of articulation, the primary distinction is not voiced vs. voiceless (as in French or Russian), but unaspirated vs. aspirated (as in Scottish Gaelic or Icelandic).

More details about the individual consonant sounds are given in the following table.

Final ,  may be pronounced without complete oral closure, resulting in a syllable that in fact ends with a long nasalized vowel. See also , below.

Denti-alveolar and retroflex series
The consonants listed in the first table above as denti-alveolar are sometimes described as alveolars, and sometimes as dentals. The affricates and the fricative are particularly often described as dentals; these are generally pronounced with the tongue on the lower teeth.

The retroflex consonants (like those of Polish) are actually apical rather than subapical, and so are considered by some authors not to be truly retroflex; they may be more accurately called post-alveolar. Some speakers not from Beijing may lack the retroflexes in their native dialects, and may thus replace them with dentals.

Alveolo-palatal series

The alveolo-palatal consonants (pinyin j, q, x) are standardly pronounced .

This is consistent with the general observation (see under ) that medial glides are realized as palatalization and/or labialization of the preceding consonant (palatalization already being inherent in the case of the palatals).

On the above analysis, the alveolo-palatals are in complementary distribution with the dentals , with the velars , and with the retroflexes , as none of these can occur before high front vowels or palatal glides, whereas the alveolo-palatals occur only before high front vowels or palatal glides. Therefore, linguists often prefer to classify  not as independent phonemes, but as allophones of one of the other three series. The Yale and Wade–Giles systems mostly treat the alveolo-palatals as allophones of the retroflexes; Tongyong Pinyin mostly treats them as allophones of the dentals; and Mainland Chinese Braille treats them as allophones of the velars. In standard pinyin and bopomofo, however, they are represented as a separate sequence.

The alveolo-palatals arose historically from a merger of the dentals  and velars  before high front vowels and glides. The change took place in the last two or three centuries at different times in different areas. Examples are Peking for Beijing, Chungking for Chongqing, Fukien for Fujian (cf. Hokkien), Tientsin for Tianjin; Sinkiang for Xinjiang (and Sian for Xi'an. The complementary distribution with the retroflex series arose when syllables that had a retroflex consonant followed by a medial glide lost the medial glide.

Zero onset
A full syllable such as ai, in which the vowel is not preceded by any of the standard initial consonants or glides, is said to have a null initial or zero onset. It has been suggested by San Duanmu that such an onset be regarded as a special phoneme, or as an instance of the phoneme , although it can also be treated as no phoneme (absence of onset). By contrast, in the case of the particle  a, which is a weak onsetless syllable, linking occurs with the previous syllable (as described under , below).

When a stressed vowel-initial Chinese syllable follows a consonant-final syllable, the consonant does not directly link with the vowel. Instead, the zero onset seems to intervene in between. ("cotton jacket") becomes , . However, in connected speech none of these output forms is natural.

Glides
The glides are commonly analyzed not as independent phonemes, but as consonantal allophones of the high vowels: .

The glides may occur in initial position in a syllable. When a glide is followed by the vowel of which that glide is considered an allophone, the glide may be regarded as epenthetic (automatically inserted), and not as a separate realization of the phoneme. It is also possible to hear both from the same speaker, even in the same conversation.

The glides can also occur in medial position, that is, after the initial consonant but before the main vowel. Here they are represented in pinyin as vowels: for example, the i in bie represents , and the u in duan represents . There are some restrictions on the possible consonant-glide combinations:  does not occur after labials (except for some speakers in bo, po, mo, fo);  does not occur after retroflexes and velars (or after ); and  occurs medially only in lüe and nüe and after alveolo-palatals (for which see above). A consonant-glide combination at the start of a syllable is articulated as a single sound – the glide is not in fact pronounced after the consonant, but is realized as palatalization , labialization , or both , of the consonant. (The same modifications of initial consonants occur in syllables where they are followed by a high vowel, although normally no glide is considered to be present there.

These are commonly analyzed as diphthongs rather than vowel-glide sequences. For example, the syllable bai is assigned the underlying representation .

Syllabic consonants
The syllables written in pinyin as zi, ci, si, zhi, chi, shi, ri may be described as a sibilant consonant (z, c, s, zh, ch, sh, r in pinyin) followed by a syllabic consonant (also known as apical vowel in classic literature):
[ ~ ], a laminal denti-alveolar voiced continuant, in zi, ci, si;
[ ~ ], an apical retroflex voiced continuant, in zhi, chi, shi, ri.

Alternatively, the nucleus may be described not as a syllabic consonant, but as a vowel:
, similar to Russian  and the vowel in American "roses", in zi, ci, si, zhi, chi, shi, ri.

Phonologically, these syllables may be analyzed as having their own vowel phoneme, .

This is more consistent with the syllabic consonant description of these syllables, and is consistent with the view that phonological representations are minimal (underspecified). When this is the case, sometimes the phoneme is described as shifting from voiceless to voiced, e.g. sī becoming .

Syllabic consonants may also arise as a result of weak syllable reduction; see below.

Vowels

Standard Chinese can be analyzed as having between two to six vowel phonemes.  (which may also be analyzed as underlying glides) are high (close) vowels,  is mid whereas  is low (open).

The precise realization of each vowel depends on its phonetic environment. These sounds can be treated as a single underlying phoneme because they are in complementary distribution.

Transcriptions of the vowels' allophones (the ways they are pronounced in particular phonetic environments) differ somewhat between sources. More details about the individual vowel allophones are given in the following table (not including the values that occur with the rhotic coda).

Zhuyin represents vowels differently from normal romanisation schemes, and as such is not displayed in the above table.

The vowel nuclei may be preceded by a glide , and may be followed by a coda . The various combinations of glide, vowel, and coda have different surface manifestations, as shown in the tables below. Any of the three positions may be empty, i.e. occupied by a null meta-phoneme .

Five vowel analysis (pinyin-based)

In this analysis, the high vowels  are fully phonemic and may form sequences with the nasal codas .

1 ü is written as u after j, q, or x (the  phoneme never occurs in these positions)
2 uo is written as o after b, p, m, or f.

Two vowel analysis (bopomofo-based)

Some linguists prefer to reduce the number of vowel phonemes further (at the expense of including underlying glides in their systems). Edwin G. Pulleyblank has proposed a system which includes underlying glides, but no vowels at all. More common are systems with two vowels; for example, in Mantaro Hashimoto's system, there are just two vowel nuclei, .

Other notes
As a general rule, vowels in open syllables (those which have no coda following the main vowel) are pronounced long, while others are pronounced short. This does not apply to weak syllables, in which all vowels are short.

In Standard Chinese, the vowels  and  harmonize in backness with the coda. For , it is fronted  before  and backed  before . For , it is fronted  before  and backed  before .

Rhotic coda

Standard Chinese features syllables that end with a rhotic coda . This feature, known in Chinese as erhua, is particularly characteristic of the Beijing dialect; many other dialects do not use it as much, and some not at all. It occurs in two cases:

In syllables in which the rhotic coda is added as a suffix to another morpheme. This suffix is represented by the character  ("son"), to which meaning it is historically related, and in pinyin as r. The suffix combines with the final sound of the syllable, and regular but complex sound changes occur as a result (described in detail under erhua).

The r final is pronounced with a relatively lax tongue, and has been described as a "retroflex vowel".

In dialects that do not make use of the rhotic coda, it may be omitted in pronunciation, or in some cases a different word may be selected: for example, Beijing  zhèr "here" and  nàr "there" may be replaced by the synonyms  zhèlǐ and  nàlǐ.

Syllables
The vowel and coda may also be grouped as the "rhyme", sometimes spelled "rime". Any of C, G, and X (and V, in some analyses) may be absent. However, in some analyses, C cannot be absent, due to the zero initial being considered a consonant.

Many of the possible combinations under the above scheme do not actually occur. There are only some 35 final combinations (medial+rime) in actual syllables (see pinyin finals). In all, there are only about 400 different syllables when tone is ignored, and about 1300 when tone is included. This is a far smaller number of distinct syllables than in a language such as English. Since Chinese syllables usually constitute whole words, or at least morphemes, the smallness of the syllable inventory results in large numbers of homophones. However, in Standard Chinese, the average word length is actually almost exactly two syllables, practically eliminating most homophony issues even when tone is disregarded, especially when context is taken into account as well. (Still, due to the limited phonetic inventory, homophonic puns in Mandarin Chinese are very common and important in Chinese culture.)

For a list of all Standard Chinese syllables (excluding tone and rhotic coda) see the pinyin table or zhuyin table.

Full and weak syllables
Syllables can be classified as full (or strong), and weak. Weak syllables are usually grammatical markers such as  le, or the second syllables of some compound words (although many other compounds consist of two or more full syllables).

A full syllable carries one of the four main tones, and some degree of stress. Weak syllables are unstressed, and have neutral tone. The contrast between full and weak syllables is distinctive; there are many minimal pairs such as  yàoshì "important matter" and  yàoshi "key", or  dàyì "main idea" and (with the same characters) dàyi "careless", the second word in each case having a weak second syllable. Some linguists consider this contrast to be primarily one of stress, while others regard it as one of tone. For further discussion, see under Neutral tone and Stress, below.
  
There is also a difference in syllable length. Full syllables can be analyzed as having two morae ("heavy"), the vowel being lengthened if there is no coda. Weak syllables, however, have a single mora ("light"), and are pronounced approximately 50% shorter than full syllables. Any weak syllable will usually be an instance of the same morpheme (and written with the same character) as some corresponding strong syllable; the weak form will often have a modified pronunciation, however, as detailed in the following section.

Syllable reduction
Apart from differences in tone, length, and stress, weak syllables are subject to certain other pronunciation changes (reduction).
If a weak syllable begins with an unaspirated obstruent, that consonant may become voiced ( respectively). For example, in  zuǐba ("mouth"), the second syllable is likely to begin with a  sound, rather than an unaspirated . 
The vowel of a weak syllable is often reduced, becoming more central. For example, in the word zuǐba just mentioned, the final vowel may become a schwa .
The coda (final consonant or offglide) of a weak syllable is often dropped (this is linked to the shorter, single-mora nature of weak syllables, as referred to above). If the dropped coda was a nasal consonant, the vowel may be nasalized. For example,  nǎodai ("head") may end with a monophthong  rather than a diphthong, and  chūntian ("spring") may end with a centralized and nasalized vowel .
In some cases, the vowel may be dropped altogether. This may occur, particularly with high vowels i, u, ü, when the unstressed syllable begins with a fricative f, h, sh, r, x, s or an aspirated p, t, k, q, ch, c consonant; for example,  dòufu ("tofu") may be said as dòu-f, and  wènti ("question") as wèn-t (the remaining initial consonant is pronounced as a syllabic consonant). The same may even occur in full syllables that have low ("half-third") tone. The vowel (and coda) may also be dropped after a nasal, in such words as  wǒmen ("we") and  shénme ("what"), which may be said as wǒm and shém – these are examples of the merger of two syllables into one, which occurs in a variety of situations in connected speech.

The example of shénme → shém also involves assimilation, which is heard even in unreduced syllables in quick speech (for example, in guǎmbō for  guǎngbō "broadcast"). A particular case of assimilation is that of the sentence-final exclamatory particle  a, a weak syllable, which has different characters for its assimilated forms:

Tones

Standard Chinese, like all varieties of Chinese, is tonal. This means that in addition to consonants and vowels, the pitch contour of a syllable is used to distinguish words from each other. Many non-native Chinese speakers have difficulties mastering the tones of each character, but correct tonal pronunciation is essential for intelligibility because of the vast number of words in the language that only differ by tone (i.e. are minimal pairs with respect to tone). Statistically, tones are as important as vowels in Standard Chinese.

The following table shows the four main tones of Standard Chinese, together with the neutral (or fifth) tone. To describe the pitch of the tones, its representation on a five-level scale is used, visualized with Chao tone letters. The values of the pitch for each tone described by Chao are traditionally considered standard, however slight regional and idiolectal variations in tone pronunciation also occur.

The Chinese names of the main four tones are respectively  yīnpíng ("dark level"),  yángpíng ("light level"),  shǎng or shàng ("rising"), and  qù ("departing"). As descriptions, they apply rather to the predecessor Middle Chinese tones than to the modern tones; see below.

Most romanization systems, including pinyin, represent the tones as diacritics on the vowels (as does zhuyin), although some, like Wade–Giles, use superscript numbers at the end of each syllable. The tone marks and numbers are rarely used outside of language textbooks: in particular, they are usually absent in public signs, company logos, and so forth. Gwoyeu Romatzyh is a rare example of a system where tones are represented using normal letters of the alphabet (although without a one-to-one correspondence).

First tone
First tone is a high-level tone. It is a steady high sound, produced as if it were being sung instead of spoken. Its pitch is usually  55 or  44, at the same level where the fourth tone starts, or a little lower. Occasionally, slightly rising or falling high pitch ( 54 or  45) is also possible.

In a few syllables, the quality of the vowel is changed when it carries first tone; see the vowel table above.

Second tone
Second tone is a rising tone. It is usually described as a high-rising ( 35), with the sound that rises from middle to high pitch (like in the English "What?!"). It starts at around 3 or 2 pitch level, and then rises towards the level of the first tone pitch (5 or 4).

It may also start with a falling or flat segment, which is quite short in male speakers (a quarter of the total second tone length), but longer in female speakers, reaching nearly half of the total length of the second tone. This initial dip is more apparent in Southern China Mandarin accent, including Standard Taiwanese Mandarin, where the second tone is also lower and alternatively described as dipping or low-rising with overall contour of  323 (its start is still slightly lower than its final pitch).

This tone is usually one of the most difficult to master for Mandarin learners, as well as the speakers of non-Mandarin Chinese varieties, who often pronounce their second tone close to (full) third tone, especially in the word-final position before a pause.

Third tone
Third tone is a low tone. It is also often termed a "dipping tone".

This tone is often demonstrated as having a rise in pitch after the low fall; however, third tone syllables that include the rise are significantly longer than other syllables. When a third-tone syllable is not said in isolation, this rise is normally heard only if it appears at the end of a sentence or before a pause, and then usually only on stressed monosyllables. The third tone without the rise is sometimes called half third tone.

The overall pitch contour of the third tone is traditionally described as  214, but for modern Standard Chinese speakers, the rise, if present, is not that high. The third tone starts lower or around the starting point for the second tone. In Beijing, its value inclines to  213 or  212, while in Taiwan it is usually  312 (Taiwanese Standard Chinese speakers also tend to never pronounce the rising part in any context). Unlike the other tones, third tone is pronounced with breathiness or murmur. 

Fourth tone
Fourth tone is a falling tone. It features a sharp fall from high to lower pitch (as is heard in curt commands in English, such as "Stop!").

It starts at the same pitch level or higher than the first tone, and then drops to the pitch 1 or 2. In connected speech, when followed by syllables with other full tones, it tends to fall only from high to mid-level. Similarly to the third tone, the final part is only pronounced before a pause or an unstressed syllable. Two consecutive fourth tones are pronounced in a zigzag pattern, with the first one higher, and the second one lower (˥˧ 53 - ˦˩ 41).

Neutral tone

Also called fifth tone or zeroth tone (in Chinese , literal meaning: "light tone"), the neutral tone is sometimes thought of as a lack of tone. It is associated with weak syllables, which are generally somewhat shorter than tonic syllables.

In Standard Chinese, about 15-20% of the syllables in written texts are considered unstressed, including certain suffixes, clitics, and particles. Second syllables of some disyllabic words are also unstressed in Northern Mandarin accents, but many Mandarin speakers in Southern China tend to preserve their inherent tone.

The pitch of a syllable with neutral tone is determined by the tone of the preceding syllable. Chao (1968) considered the neutral tone syllables to not have pitch contour. He introduced special dotted tone letters to denote its pitch. Later studies, however, found that the neutral tone syllables do have pitch contour. The following table shows the pitch at which the neutral tone is pronounced in Standard Chinese after each of the four main tones. For contoured pitch analysis, first column shows the pitch contour directly after the full tone syllable, and second column shows the pitch contour after another neutral tone syllable.

Although the contrast between weak and full syllables is often distinctive, the neutral tone is often not described as a full-fledged tone; some linguists feel that it results from a "spreading out" of the tone on the preceding syllable. This idea is appealing because without it, the neutral tone needs relatively complex tone sandhi rules to be made sense of; indeed, it would have to have four allotones, one for each of the four tones that could precede it. However, the "spreading" theory incompletely characterizes the neutral tone, especially in sequences where more than one neutral-tone syllable is found adjacent. In Modern Standard Mandarin as applied in A Dictionary of Current Chinese, the second syllable of words with a 'toneless final syllable variant' (重·次輕詞語) can be read with either a neutral tone or with the normal tone.

Relationship between Middle Chinese and modern tones
The four tones of Middle Chinese are not in one-to-one correspondence with the modern tones. The following table shows the development of the traditional tones as reflected in modern Standard Chinese. The development of each tone depends on the initial consonant of the syllable: whether it was a voiceless consonant (denoted in the table by v−), a voiced obstruent (v+), or a sonorant (s). (The voiced–voiceless distinction has been lost in modern Standard Chinese.)

Tone sandhi

Pronunciation also varies with context according to the rules of tone sandhi. Some such changes have been noted above in the descriptions of the individual tones; however, the most prominent phenomena of this kind relate to consecutive sequences of third-tone syllables. There are also a few common words that have variable tone.

Third tone sandhi
The principal rule of third tone sandhi is:
When there are two consecutive third-tone syllables, the first of them is pronounced with second tone.
For example, lǎoshǔ 老鼠 ("mouse") is pronounced  as if it were láoshǔ. It has been investigated whether the rising contour on the prior syllable is in fact identical to a normal second tone. It has been concluded that it is identical at least in terms of auditory perception.

When there are three or more third tones in a row, the situation becomes more complicated since a third tone that precedes a second tone resulting from third tone sandhi may or may not be subject to sandhi itself. The results may depend on word boundaries, stress, and dialectal variations. General rules for three-syllable third-tone combinations can be formulated as follows:
 If the first word is two syllables and the second word is one syllable, the first two syllables become second tones. For example, bǎoguǎn hǎo 保管好 ("to take good care of") is pronounced báoguán hǎo .
 If the first word has one syllable, and the second word has two syllables, the second syllable becomes second tone, but the first syllable remains third tone. For example, lǎo bǎoguǎn 老保管 ("to take care of all the time") is pronounced lǎo báoguǎn .

Some linguists have put forward more comprehensive systems of sandhi rules for multiple third tone sequences. For example, it has been proposed that modifications are applied cyclically, initially within rhythmic feet (trochees; see below) and that sandhi "need not apply between two cyclic branches".

Tones on special syllables
Special rules apply to the tones heard on the words (or morphemes)  bù ("not") and  yī ("one").

For  bù:
  is pronounced with second tone when followed by a fourth tone syllable.
 Example:  (bù+shì, "to not be") becomes búshì 
 In other cases,  is pronounced with fourth tone. However, when used between words in an A-not-A question, it may become neutral in tone (e.g.,  shìbushì).

For  yī: 
  is pronounced with second tone when followed by a fourth tone syllable.
 Example:  (yī+dìng, "must") becomes yídìng 
 Before a first, second or third tone syllable, 一 is pronounced with fourth tone.
 Examples： (yī+tiān, "one day") becomes yìtiān ,  (yī+nián, "one year") becomes yìnián ,  (yī+qǐ, "together") becomes yìqǐ .
 When final, or when it comes at the end of a multi-syllable word (regardless of the first tone of the next word),  is pronounced with first tone. It also has first tone when used as an ordinal number (or part of one), and when it is immediately followed by any digit (including another ; hence both syllables of the word  yīyī and its compounds have first tone). 
 When  is used between two reduplicated words, it may become neutral in tone (e.g.  kànyikàn ("to take a look of")).

The numbers  qī ("seven") and  bā ("eight") sometimes display similar tonal behavior as  yī, but for most modern speakers they are always pronounced with first tone. (All of these numbers, and  bù, were historically Ru tones, and as noted above, that tone does not have predictable reflexes in modern Chinese; this may account for the variation in tone on these words.)

Second and fourth tone change
In conversational speech, when the rising tone (tone 2) or falling tone (tone 4) occur in a conflicting context, they change their pitch contours.

Tone 2 becomes higher and changes its direction, approaching the tone 1 pitch contour, when put between tone 1 or 2 and any other full tone.

Rising tone induced by the tone 3 sandhi also undergoes this transformation.

The status of this tone change is ambiguous. Some authors consider it a tone sandhi akin to the third tone sandhi: Yuen Ren Chao considered the changed tone 2 to be identical to tone 1, and Cao Wen treated it as tone 1 (before tones 1 or 4) or tone 4 (before tones 2 or 3). Both views are overgeneralizations to some extent, and the exact pitch contour of the changed tone 2 varies between mid-level ˧ (in isolated words, at a slower speaking rate) and slighly falling high ˥˦ (in a carrier sentence, at a faster speaking rate).

Tone 4 becomes lower and flatter, but still slightly falling, akin to Cantonese tone 3, when put between tone 3 or 4 and tone 1 or 4.

Unlike with changed tone 2, the changed tone 4 pitch contour was only insignificantly influenced by the change of speaking rate, provided it was still at conversational speed.

The resulting pitch contours, especially that of the changed tone 4, are not associated with a phonemic tone in Mandarin. In perceptual experiments, native Beijing Mandarin speakers could easily recognize the intended tone in the original word, but could not recognize it when it was stripped from the context (when the adjacent syllables were replace by the white noise):
changed tone 2 was perceived as tone 1 in over 70% of responses;
changed tone 4 was perceived as tone 1 in over 50% of responses;
both of them were properly recognized in only 20% of responses.

Besides the speech rate, the frequency of expression may also play a role in triggering this tone change. The changed tone 2 (that normally required tone 1 or 2 to precede it) is also said to occur in Gòngchǎndǎng (共產黨; 共产党 "communist party") in place of sandhied tone 3, but it remains to be seen whether there are more examples with initial tone 4.

Stress, rhythm and intonation
Stress within words (word stress) is not felt strongly by Chinese speakers, although contrastive stress is perceived easily (and functions much the same as in other languages). One of the reasons for the weaker perception of stress in Chinese may be that variations in the fundamental frequency of speech, which in many other languages serve as a cue for stress, are used in Chinese primarily to realize the tones. Nonetheless, there is still a link between stress and pitch – the range of pitch variation (for a given tone) has been observed to be greater on syllables that carry more stress.

As discussed above, weak syllables have neutral tone and are unstressed. Although this property can be contrastive, the contrast is interpreted by some as being primarily one of tone rather than stress. (Some linguists analyze Chinese as lacking word stress entirely.)

Apart from this contrast between full and weak syllables, some linguists have also identified differences in levels of stress among full syllables. In some descriptions, a multi-syllable word or compound is said to have the strongest stress on the final syllable, and the next strongest generally on the first syllable. Others, however, reject this analysis, noting that the apparent final-syllable stress can be ascribed purely to natural lengthening of the final syllable of a phrase, and disappears when a word is pronounced within a sentence rather than in isolation. San Duanmu takes this view, and concludes that it is the first syllable that is most strongly stressed. He also notes a tendency for Chinese to produce trochees – feet consisting of a stressed syllable followed by one (or in this case sometimes more) unstressed syllables. On this view, if the effect of "final-lengthening" is factored out:
 In words (compounds) of two syllables, the first syllable has the main stress, and the second lacks stress.
 In words (compounds) of three syllables, the first syllable is stressed most strongly, the second lacks stress, and the third may lack stress or have secondary stress.
 In words (compounds) of four syllables, the first syllable is stressed most strongly, the second lacks stress, and the third or fourth may lack stress or have secondary stress depending on the syntactic structure of the compound.

The positions described here as lacking stress are the positions in which weak (neutral-tone) syllables may occur, although full syllables frequently occur in these positions also.

There is a strong tendency for Chinese prose to employ four-syllable 'prosodic words' consisting of alternating stressed and unstressed syllables which are further subdivided into two trochaic feet.  This structure, sometimes known as a 'four-character template' (四字格), is particularly prevalent in chengyu, which are classical idioms that are usually four characters in length.   Statistical analysis of chengyu and other idiomatic phrases in vernacular texts indicates that the four-syllable prosodic word had become an important metrical consideration by the Wei/Jin dynasties (4th century CE).

This preference for trochaic feet may even result in polysyllabic words in which the foot and word (morpheme) boundaries do not align.  For example, 'Czechoslovakia' is stressed as 捷克/斯洛/伐克 and 'Yugoslavia' is stressed as 南斯/拉夫, even though the morpheme boundaries are 捷克/斯洛伐克 'Czech[o]/slovak[ia]' and 南/斯拉夫 'South/slav[ia]', respectively.  The preferred stress pattern also has a complex effect on tone sandhi for the various Chinese dialects.

This preference for a trochaic metrical structure is also cited as a reason for certain phenomena of word order variation within complex compounds, and for the strong tendency to use disyllabic words rather than monosyllables in certain positions. Many Chinese monosyllables have alternative disyllabic forms with virtually identical meaning – see .

Another function of voice pitch is to carry intonation. Chinese makes frequent use of particles to express certain meanings such as doubt, query, command, etc., reducing the need to use intonation. However, intonation is still present in Chinese (expressing meanings rather similarly as in standard English), although there are varying analyses of how it interacts with the lexical tones. Some linguists describe an additional intonation rise or fall at the end of the last syllable of an utterance, while others have found that the pitch of the entire utterance is raised or lowered according to the desired intonational meaning.

Notes

References

Citations

Works cited

External links 
 
 

Phonology
Sino-Tibetan phonologies